Nicolae Bejenaru (born 30 May 1968) is a Romanian gymnast. He competed at the 1988 Summer Olympics and the 1992 Summer Olympics.

References

1968 births
Living people
Romanian male artistic gymnasts
Olympic gymnasts of Romania
Gymnasts at the 1988 Summer Olympics
Gymnasts at the 1992 Summer Olympics
Gymnasts from Bucharest
20th-century Romanian people